Tobi 22 - Coptic Calendar - Tobi 24

The twenty-third day of the Coptic month of Tobi, the fifth month of the Coptic year. On a common year, this day corresponds to January 18, of the Julian Calendar, and January 31, of the Gregorian Calendar. This day falls in the Coptic Season of Shemu, the season of the Harvest.

Commemorations

Saints 

 The martyrdom of Saint Timothy the Apostle
 The departure of Pope Cyril IV, the 110th Patriarch of the See of Saint Mark

References 

Days of the Coptic calendar